Manuel Contepomi (born 20 August 1977 in Buenos Aires) is an Argentine rugby union footballer. He started playing Rugby at his secondary school, Colegio Cardenal Newman, and currently plays for Club Newman in the Unión de Rugby de Buenos Aires competition. He has also made numerous appearances for the Argentina national team. He is the twin brother of fellow Argentine rugby international Felipe Contepomi.

He formerly played for Bristol in the Guinness Premiership and Rovigo in Italy.

Contepomi played for the national under-19 and under-21 Argentina sides in the early years of his career. After making his international debut for Argentina in 1998, he was included in the 1999 Rugby World Cup squad for Wales. He made his second World Cup appearance at the 2003 Rugby World Cup in Australia, and is third at the 2007 Rugby World Cup, in France, where Argentina reached the 3rd place.

Facts
Manuel Contepomi has received the prestigious Olimpia de Plata for Rugby on two occasions, in 1998 and 2001.

External links
 UAR profile
 Manuel Contepomi on the official Rugby World Cup 2007 site
 1999 RWC profile
 Manuel Contepomi signs for the Bristol Shoguns
 Unión de Rugby de Buenos Aires

1977 births
Living people
Rugby union players from Buenos Aires
Argentine rugby union players
Bristol Bears players
Club Newman rugby union players
Rugby Rovigo Delta players
Rugby union centres
Argentine twins
Argentina international rugby union players
Twin sportspeople
Argentine expatriate rugby union players
Expatriate rugby union players in England
Expatriate rugby union players in Italy
Argentine expatriate sportspeople in Italy
Argentine expatriate sportspeople in England
Argentina international rugby sevens players
Male rugby sevens players
People educated at Colegio Cardenal Newman